Vito McKeever (born October 8, 1961) is a former American football defensive back. He played for the Tampa Bay Buccaneers from 1986 to 1987.

References

1961 births
Living people
American football defensive backs
Florida Gators football players
Michigan Panthers players
Oakland Invaders players
Tampa Bay Buccaneers players